The Meier & Frank Warehouse, located in northwest Portland, Oregon, is listed on the National Register of Historic Places.  Built in 1923 for longtime Portland-based retail company Meier & Frank, it was added to the National Register in 2000.

See also
 Meier & Frank Delivery Depot
 National Register of Historic Places listings in Northwest Portland, Oregon

References

External links

1909 establishments in Oregon
Commercial buildings completed in 1909
Commercial buildings on the National Register of Historic Places in Oregon
Buildings designated early commercial in the National Register of Historic Places
Pearl District, Portland, Oregon
Warehouses on the National Register of Historic Places
National Register of Historic Places in Portland, Oregon
Meier & Frank